Warren Jenkins was the 11th mayor of Columbus, Ohio.  He resigned his office as mayor on September 4, 1837 to become a bank cashier at the Mechanics Savings Institute.  His successor after 1837 was Philo H. Olmsted.

References

Bibliography

External links
Warren Jenkins at Political Graveyard

Mayors of Columbus, Ohio
19th-century American politicians